Nils Daniel Bragderyd (born 15 March 1991) is a Swedish actor.

Filmography
Percy, Buffalo Bill och jag (2005)
 2003 – Don't Cry Wolf
Pappa polis (2002)
Hjälp! Rånare! (2002)

References

External links

1991 births
Living people
Swedish male actors